Pyrenaearia cantabrica is a species of small air-breathing land snail, a terrestrial pulmonate gastropod mollusc in the family Hygromiidae, the hairy snails and their allies. 

Subspecies
 Pyrenaearia cantabrica cantabrica (Hidalgo, 1873)
 Pyrenaearia cantabrica covadongae (Ortiz de Zárate López, 1956)
 Pyrenaearia cantabrica poncebensis Ortiz de Zárate López, 1956
 Pyrenaearia cantabrica schaufussi (Kobelt, 1876)

This species is endemic to Spain.

References

 Bank, R. A.; Neubert, E. (2017). Checklist of the land and freshwater Gastropoda of Europe. Last update: July 16th, 2017

Pyrenaearia
Endemic fauna of Spain
Gastropods described in 1873